The following is a list of the Teen Choice Award winners and nominees for Choice Movie Rumble. The first ceremony took place in 2005.

Winners and nominees
Winners are highlighted in bold text.

2000s

2010s

References

Rumble